The Cuba women's national volleyball team was the first team to break the USSR's and Japan's domination in the world women's volleyball by winning the 1978 World Women's Volleyball Championship.

Cuba women's national volleyball team dominated the world in the last decade of the 20th century (1991–2000), winning eight times in row as FIVB World Champions in straight (6th World Cup in 1991, Barcelona Olympic Games in 1992, 12th World Championship in 1994, 7th World Cup in 1995, Atlanta Olympic Games in 1996, 13th World Championship in 1998, 8th World Cup in 1999, Sydney Olympic Games in 2000).

The team's nickname was  Las Espectaculares Morenas del Caribe "The Spectacular Caribbean Girls" in English.

Winner of 10 major world titles

# – 8 consecutive major titles in 1990s (World Women's Volleyball Championship, World Cup, Olympic Games)

Results

Olympic Games
 1964 – did not participate
 1968 – did not participate
 1972 – 6th place
 1976 – 6th place
 1980 – 6th place
 1984 – did not participate
 1988 – did not participate
 1992 –  Gold Medal
 1996 –  Gold Medal
 2000 –  Gold Medal
 2004 –  Bronze Medal
 2008 – 4th place
 2012 – did not participate
2016 – did not participate
2020 – did not participate

World Championship
 1952 – did not compete
 1956 – did not compete
 1960 – did not compete
 1962 – did not compete
 1967 – did not compete
 1970 – 8th place
 1974 – 7th place
 1978 –  Gold Medal
 1982 – 5th place
 1986 –  Silver Medal
 1990 – 4th place
 1994 –  Gold Medal
 1998 –  Gold Medal
 2002 – 5th place
 2006 – 7th place
 2010 – 12th place
 2014 – 21st place
 2018 – 22nd place

World Cup
1973 – 5th place
1977 –  Silver Medal
1981 – 6th place
1985 –  Silver Medal
1989 –  Gold Medal
1991 –  Gold Medal
1995 –  Gold Medal
1999 –  Gold Medal
2003 – 6th place
2007 – 4th place
2011 – did not qualify
2015 – 9th place

World Grand Prix
 1993 –  Gold Medal
 1994 –  Silver Medal
 1995 –  Bronze Medal
 1996 –  Silver Medal
 1997 –  Silver Medal
 1998 –  Bronze Medal
 1999 – 5th place
 2000 –  Gold Medal
 2001 – 4th place
 2002 – 7th place
 2003 – 11th place
 2004 – 4th place
 2005 – 4th place
 2006 – 4th place
 2007 – 7th place
 2008 –  Silver Medal
 2009 – did not participate
 2010 – did not participate
 2011 – 11th place
 2012 – 6th place
 2013 – 19th place
 2014 – 20th place
 2015 – 25th place
 2016 – 25th place

FIVB World Grand Champions Cup
 1993 –  Gold Medal
 1997 –  Silver Medal

Pan American Games
 1955 – did not participate
 1959 – did not participate
 1963 – did not participate
 1967 –  Bronze Medal
 1971 –  Gold Medal
 1975 –  Gold Medal
 1979 –  Gold Medal
 1983 –  Gold Medal
 1987 –  Gold Medal
 1991 –  Gold Medal
 1995 –  Gold Medal
 1999 –  Silver Medal
 2003 –  Silver Medal
 2007 –  Gold Medal
 2011 –  Silver Medal
 2015 – 5th place

Pan-American Cup
 2002 –  Gold Medal
 2003 –  Bronze Medal
 2004 –  Gold Medal
 2005 –  Gold Medal
 2006 –  Silver Medal
 2007 –  Gold Medal
 2008 – 11th place
 2009 – did not participate
 2010 – 4th place
 2011 – 4th place
 2012 –  Bronze Medal
 2013 – 6th place
 2014 – 5th place
 2015 – 4th place
 2016 – 4th place
 2017 – 5th place
 2018 – 7th place
 2019 – 8th place
 2020 – 5th place
 2021 – 5th place

Final Four Cup
 2008 – 4th place
 2009 – did not participate
 2010 – did not participate

Current squad
The following is the Cuban roster in the 2018 World Championship.

Head coach: Tomás Fernández

Former squads
 1976 Olympic Games – 5th place
Nelly Barnet, Evelina Borroto, Ana Díaz, Ana María García, Miriam Herrera, Mercedes Pérez, Mercedes Pomares, Mercedes Roca, Melanea Tartabull, Imilsis Téllez, Lucila Urgelles and Claudina Villaurrutia. Head coach: Eugenio George Lafita.
 1978 World Championship –  Gold medal
 Nelly Barnet, Ana Díaz, Erenia Díaz, Ana María García, Mavis Guilarte, Libertad González, Sirenia Martínez, Mercedes Pérez, Mercedes Pomares, Imilsis Téllez and Lucila Urgelles. Head coach: Eugenio George Lafita.
 1980 Olympic Games – 5th place
 Maura Alfonso, Nelly Barnet, Ana Díaz, Erenia Díaz, Josefina Capote, Ana María García, Libertad Gonzalez, Mavis Guilarte, Mercedes Pérez, Mercedes Pomares, Imilsis Téllez and Lucila Urgelles. Head coach: Eugenio George Lafita.
 1992 Olympic Games –  Gold medal
Regla Bell, Mercedes Calderón, Magalys Carvajal, Marlenys Costa, Ana Fernández, Idalmis Gato, Lilia Izquierdo, Norka Latamblet, Mireya Luis, Raisa O'Farril, Tania Ortiz and Regla Torres. Head coach: Eugenio George Lafita.
 1994 World Championship –  Gold medal
Regla Bell, Mercedes Calderón, Magalys Carvajal, Marlenys Costa, Ana Fernández, Mirka Francia, Idalmis Gato, Mireya Luis Hernández, Lilia Izquierdo, Sonia Lescaille, Tania Ortíz and Regla Torres. Head coach: Eugenio George Lafita.
 1996 Olympic Games –  Gold medal
Taismary Agüero, Regla Bell, Magalys Carvajal, Marlenys Costa, Ana Fernández, Mirka Francia, Idalmis Gato, Lilia Izquierdo, Mireya Luis, Raisa O'Farril, Yumilka Ruíz and Regla Torres. Head coach: Eugenio George Lafita.
 1998 World Championship –  Gold medal
Taismary Agüero, Regla Bell, Marlenys Costa, Mirka Francia, Mireya Luis, Lilia Izquierdo, Liana Mesa, Indira Mestre, Yumilka Ruíz, Martha Sánchez, Regla Torres and Ana Fernández. Head coach: Antonio Perdomo.
 1999 FIVB World Cup –  Gold medal
Taismary Agüero, Azurima Álvarez, Regla Bell, Marlenys Costa, Mirka Francia, Lilia Izquierdo, Enia Martínez, Liana Mesa, Yoselín Roque Palacios, Yumilka Ruíz, Martha Sánchez and Ana Fernández. Head coach: Antonio Perdomo.
 2000 Olympic Games –  Gold medal
Taismary Agüero, Zoila Barros, Regla Bell, Marlenys Costa, Ana Fernández, Mirka Francia, Idalmis Gato, Lilia Izquierdo, Mireya Luis, Yumilka Ruíz, Martha Sánchez and Regla Torres. Head coach: Luis Felipe Calderón
2001 FIVB World Grand Prix – 4th place
Zoila Barros, Ana Fernández, Maisbelis Martínez, Misleidis Martínez, Liana Mesa, Indira Mestre, Anniara Muñoz, Yoslan Muñoz, Yaima Ortiz, Yumilka Ruíz, Martha Sánchez and Regla Torres. Head coach: Luis Felipe Calderón.
 2002 World Championship – 5th place
Zoila Barros, Rosir Calderón, Nancy Carrillo, Liana Mesa, Indira Mestre, Anniara Muñoz, Yoslan Muñoz, Yaima Ortiz, Yumilka Ruíz, Martha Sánchez, Yanelis Santos and Regla Torres. Head coach: Luis Felipe Calderón.
 2003 FIVB World Cup – 6th place
Zoila Barros, Rosir Calderón, Nancy Carrillo, Maisbelis Martínez, Liana Mesa, Anniara Muñoz, Yaima Ortiz, Daimí Ramírez, Yumilka Ruíz, Martha Sánchez, Yanelis Santos and Dulce Téllez. Head coach: Luis Felipe Calderón.
 2004 Olympic Games –  Bronze medal
 Zoila Barros, Rosir Calderón, Nancy Carrillo, Ana Fernández, Maisbelis Martínez, Liana Mesa, Anniara Muñoz, Yaima Ortíz, Daimí Ramírez, Yumilka Ruíz, Marta Sánchez and María Téllez. Head coach: Luis Felipe Calderón.
 2005 FIVB World Grand Prix – 4th place
 Zoila Barros, Rosir Calderón, Nancy Carrillo, Kenia Carcaces, Maisbelis Martínez, Liana Mesa, Yaima Ortíz, Daimí Ramírez, Yumilka Ruíz, Rachel Sánchez and Yanelis Santos. Head coach: Luis Felipe Calderón.
 2006 World Championship – 7th place
 Lisbet Arredondo, Zoila Barros, Rosir Calderón, Kenia Carcaces, Nancy Carrillo, Yenisey Gonzalez, Liana Mesa, Yaima Ortíz, Daimí Ramírez, Yumilka Ruíz (c), Rachel Sánchez and Yanelis Santos. Head coach: Eugenio George Lafita.
 2007 NORCECA Championship –  Gold medal
 Zoila Barros, Rosir Calderón, Nancy Carrillo, Kenia Carcaces, Yenisey González, Yusleidys Hernández, Yaima Ortíz, Daimí Ramírez, Yumilka Ruíz (c), Yanelis Santos, Yusidey Silié and Gyselle Silva. Head coach: Antonio Perdomo.
2007 FIVB World Cup – 4th place
Zoila Barros, Rosir Calderón, Kenia Carcaces, Nancy Carrillo, Yenisei González, Yusleidys Herera, Yaima Ortiz, Daimí Ramírez, Yumilka Ruíz (c), Dominica Salmon, Rachel Sánchez, Yanelis Santos and Yusidey Silié. Head coach: Antonio Perdomo.
2011 Pan-American Games –  Silver medal
Emily Borrell, Kenia Carcaces, Liannes Castañeda, Ana Yilian Cleger, Rosanna Giel, Daymara Lescay, Yoana Palacios, Alena Rojas, Wilma Salas, Yanelis Santos, Yusidey Silie (c) and Gyselle Silva. Head coach: Juan Carlos Gala.

See also
Cuba women's national under-23 volleyball team
Cuba women's national under-20 volleyball team
Cuba women's national under-18 volleyball team

References

External links
FIVB profile

Volleyball
National women's volleyball teams
Volleyball in Cuba